The Bicol ground warbler (Robsonius sorsogonensis) is a species of passerine bird in the family Locustellidae. It is endemic to the island of Luzon in the Philippines, where it is found in the southern parts of the island. Along with its other conspecifics, such as the Cordillera ground warbler and the Sierra Madre ground warbler, it is one of the most elusive birds in the country.  Its natural habitat is tropical moist lowland forest. It is threatened by habitat loss.

Description 
EBird describes the bird as "A medium-sized bird of lowland and foothill forest floor, often in rocky areas. Fairly stout of body and bill, with long legs and large feet. Pale below with a grayish band across the chest and brown under the base of the tail. Note white throat, brown upperparts with two dotted white wingbars, rufous edging to the wing and tail feathers, and thin black moustache stripe. Unmistakable. Song consists of a very high-pitched “tseeeep soo tseeeep!"

The Bicol ground warbler was described by the ornithologists Austin L. Rand and Dioscoro S. Rabor in 1967 and given the binomial name Napothera sorsogonensis where it was conspecific with the Cordillera ground warbler and Sierra Madre ground warbler. The specific epithet is from the name of the province Sorsogon in the  Bicol Region of the Philippines where the species was first discovered. It was initially believed to belong to the Old World babblers family Timaliidae and given the English name "grey-banded babbler" but this was changed to "Bicol ground warbler" when its taxonomic position was better understood. It is now placed in the genus Robsonius that was introduced by the English ornithologist Nigel J. Collar in 2006.

Habitat and conservation status 
It is found in lowland moist dipterocarp forest in primary forest, secondary forest and forest edge up to 1,000 m. It is typically found among limestone outcrops, bamboo and mossy rocks. 

IUCN has assessed this bird as near threatened. The population size has not been quantified, but it is plausible that the species numbers less than 10,000 mature individuals. This species' main threat is habitat loss with wholesale clearance of forest habitats as a result of logging, agricultural conversion and mining activities occurring within the range. 

It is found in two protected areas in Quezon Protected Landscape and Mount Isarog National Park; however, like most areas in the Philippines protection is lax.  

Conservation actions proposed include assessing the population size and establishing a monitoring programme to quantify trends; establishing its ability to persist in degraded habitats; identifying and assessing threats; and ensuring that the Quezon Protected Landscape and Mount Isarog National Park are more effectively protected.

References

Collar, N. J. & Robson, C. 2007. Family Timaliidae (Babblers)  pp. 70 – 291 in; del Hoyo, J., Elliott, A. & Christie, D.A. eds. Handbook of the Birds of the World, Vol. 12. Picathartes to Tits and Chickadees. Lynx Edicions, Barcelona.

Bicol ground warbler
Bicol ground warbler
Bicol ground warbler
Bicol ground warbler